The 2014–15 FEI Show Jumping World Cup is an annual international competition among the world's best show jumping horses and riders 2014–15 season. The series features boats which feature at the Olympics.

World Cup program

Results 

Show Jumping World Cup
2014 in show jumping
2015 in show jumping